"¿Qué Me Faltó?" is a song written and recorded by the American musical duo Ha*Ash. It was released on January 4, 2019, as the fourth of the single from their fifth studio album 30 de Febrero (2017). The song then included on their live album Ha*Ash: En Vivo (2019). It was written by Ashley Grace, Hanna Nicole and José Luis Ortega.

Background and release 
"¿Qué Me Faltó?" was written by Ashley Grace, Hanna Nicole and José Luis Ortega and produced by Hanna and George Noriega. The band started working on the song during the 1F Hecho Realidad Tour. It was confirmed the single to be the third single from the album on January 4, 2019. The song went to Latin radio stations in early November, 2018.

Music video 
The music video was released on January 4 on the Ha*Ash's YouTube and the other video channels. The clip was recorded in the beach in Oaxaca, México. It was under the direction by Toño Tzinzun. , the video has over 40 million views on YouTube.

The live video for "¿Qué Me Faltó?", recorded live for the live album Ha*Ash: En Vivo, was released on December 6, 2019. The video was filmed in Auditorio Nacional, Mexico City.

Commercial performance 
The track peaked two on the Monitor Latino in Mexico. In August 2019, the songs was certified as Gold in Mexico.

Live performances 
Ha*Ash performed "¿Qué Me Faltó?" for the first time at the program "Al Aire Con Paola Rojas" on December 6, 2017.

Credits and personnel 
Credits adapted from Genius.

Recording and management

 Recording Country: United States
 Sony / ATV Discos Music Publishing LLC / Westwood Publishing
 (P) 2017 Sony Music Entertainment México, S.A. De C.V.

Ha*Ash
 Ashley Grace  – vocals, guitar, songwriting
 Hanna Nicole  – vocals, guitar, songwriting, production
Additional personnel
 Pete Wallace  – keyboards, editor, engineer
 Diego Contento  – engineer
 Dave Clauss  – engineer
 George Noriega  – engineer, director, guitar
 Matt Calderín  – drums

Charts

Weekly charts

Year-end charts

Certifications

Release history

References 

Ha*Ash songs
Songs written by Ashley Grace
Songs written by Hanna Nicole
Songs written by José Luis Ortega
Song recordings produced by George Noriega
2017 songs
2019 singles
Spanish-language songs
Sony Music Latin singles
2010s ballads
Pop ballads